Juma may refer to:
Juma (Musical Artist) Born 1999 in New York
Juma (name), including a list of people with the name
Juma (actor) (born Jumas Omar, 1943-1989)
Juma (jaguar), a jaguar that was featured then killed during the 2016 Summer Olympics in Brazil
Juma, Mozambique, a village in Cabo Delgado Province
Juma, Uzbekistan
Juma people, indigenous to Brazil
Juma language
Juma River (Brazil), Amazonas State
Juma River (China)

See also
Al-Jumua, the 62nd Sura of the Qur'an from which the names Juma and Jumaa mostly derive
Jamia, the Arabic word for gathering
Juma Masjid, meaning Congregational Mosque, several buildings
Jumaa, a surname
Jumar, a device used by mountaineers
Jumu'ah the congregational Friday prayer of Islam
Juma and the Magic Jinn, a children's picture book

Language and nationality disambiguation pages